Futagodake Takeshi (born 15 November 1943 as Takeshi Yamanaka) is a former sumo wrestler from Kanagi, Aomori, Japan. He made his professional debut in January 1961, and reached the top division in January 1967. His highest rank was komusubi. He retired in September 1976 and became an elder in the Japan Sumo Association. In 1993 he branched out from Futagoyama stable and opened up Araiso stable. Araiso stable folded when Futagodake reached the mandatory retirement age of 65 in November 2008.

Career record

See also
Glossary of sumo terms
List of past sumo wrestlers
List of komusubi

References

1943 births
Living people
Japanese sumo wrestlers
Sumo people from Aomori Prefecture
Komusubi